Daniel Jonathon Lobb (born 7 January 1972) is a British retired tennis player and television presenter, best known for co-presenting the ITV Breakfast programme Daybreak from 2010 until 2012. Since 2015, he co-presents Cowboy Builders on Channel 5.

Early life
Lobb grew up in Colden Common near Winchester, Hampshire. He attended Peter Symonds College in Winchester, where he studied Biology, Chemistry and Economics.

Tennis career
Lobb was assisted by College Prospects of America to gain a tennis scholarship to the University of Tennessee at Martin in the USA. He was named as an All-American (for tennis) and graduated from the school of Business with high honours. After coaching at various tennis clubs in London, Lobb played professionally for three years reaching a British ranking of 18 in 1997. After retiring in 1998 he combined coaching and modelling for three years as well as getting involved in sports PR and marketing in London.

Broadcasting career
In 2001, Lobb started part-time work at a local cable station assisting the sports producer before being given the opportunity to present a live show. From there he moved on to 5 News and was offered a contract by Sky Sports in January 2002, presenting mostly on Sky Sports News. In October 2007, he began presenting The Club on Sky Poker, a humorous magazine show based around Poker. He presented with Matt Broughton. On 30 December 2008 during a live Sky Sports News programme, Lobb was co-presenting with Simon Thomas when it was revealed that this would be Lobb's final appearance on the channel. Thomas thanked Lobb for his seven-year service and joked that he was "still the only presenter to have beat Tim Henman - as he has liked to remind us over 400 times!" (This was in reference to Lobb's professional tennis career). In May 2009, Lobb became a sports presenter on Sky News.

Lobb moved to GMTV as the sports correspondent in January 2010. He transferred to the replacement programme Daybreak on 6 September 2010, appointed sports editor, and stand-in presenter. On 2 September, he took over from Adrian Chiles as the Friday co-presenter of Daybreak and on 6 December 2011 he took over from Chiles full-time on an interim basis. Aled Jones was appointed as Chiles' permanent replacement with Lobb leaving the programme on 31 August 2012.

On 6 September 2011, it was announced that Lobb would take part in the 2011 series of Strictly Come Dancing on BBC One. He was partnered with Katya Virshilas. He was the second person to be voted off the show. In January 2013 he presented a one-off Ping pong event for Sky Sports.

In 2015, Lobb returned to television as a co-presenter of Cowboy Builders on Channel 5.

Lobb has been a commentator on Wimbledon television broadcasts for Wimbledon Broadcasting Services.

Filmography

References

External links
 Dan Lobb Official website (archived)
 Dan Lobb on Twitter

British sports broadcasters
GMTV presenters and reporters
ITV Breakfast presenters and reporters
Living people
Sportspeople from Winchester
Sky Sports presenters and reporters
1972 births
British male tennis players
UT Martin Skyhawks athletes
College men's tennis players in the United States
Mass media people from Winchester